SS Traffic was a baggage tender of the White Star Line, built in 1872 by Philip Speakman in Runcorn and made of English Oak. She was outfitted with machinery at the Old Quay Dock by Mr. W. P. Gaulton, an engineer from Manchester. She was based at the Port of Liverpool, and maintained a 24-year career with White Star. Traffic briefly served as a cargo vessel, but soon returned to tendering service.

On 10 January 1878, Traffic was run into by the steamship Maggie Ann at Liverpool and was severely damaged. She was beached. In 1896, Traffic was sold to the Liverpool Lighterage Co., where she served for fifty-nine years in reliable service. On 5 May 1941 she was sunk in Liverpool docks by German aircraft during the 'May Blitz'. She was later raised and returned to service, she was broken up at Tranmere in 1955, at an age of eighty-two years. She was the only baggage tender used by the White Star Line until the company's SS Pontic entered service in 1894.

See also

References

Service vessels of the United Kingdom
Transport in Liverpool
1872 ships
Ships of the White Star Line
Maritime incidents in January 1878